Eduardo Miguel Sánchez-Quiros (born December 20, 1968) is a Cuban-born American director, known for his work in the horror genre. His most famous credit is for co-directing and writing the 1999 psychological horror film The Blair Witch Project with Daniel Myrick.

Biography
Born in 1968, Sánchez moved to Spain with his family at the age of two, before settling in the United States in 1972. His family located to Montgomery County, Maryland, where he attended Wheaton High School. He later studied television production at Montgomery College in Maryland  and obtained his B.A. degree from the University of Central Florida Film Department where he studied with Mary C. Johnson and Charles Harpole. In 1999, Sánchez was joint-recipient of the inaugural Independent Spirit John Cassavetes Award.

Filmography
Feature films
The Blair Witch Project (1999)
Altered (2006)
Seventh Moon (2008)
Lovely Molly (2011)
Exists (2014) 
Butterfly Kisses (2018)

Short films
Curse of the Blair Witch (1999)
Sticks and Stones: Investigating the Blair Witch (1999)
A Ride in the Park (2013) (segment from V/H/S/2)

Web series
ParaAbnormal (2009)
Four Corners of Fear (2013)

Television episodes
Supernatural (2005–2020) (5 episodes)
Intruders (2014) (4 episodes)
From Dusk Till Dawn: The Series (2014–2016) (4 episodes)
12 Deadly Days (2016) (1 episode)
Lucifer (2016–2021) (2 episodes)
Queen of the South (2016–2021) (8 episodes)
Taken (2017–18) (2 episodes)
The Passage (2019) (episode "You Are like the Sun")
The InBetween (2019) (episode "The Devil's Refugee")
neXt (2020) (episode "file #4")
Nancy Drew (2021) (episode "The Reunion of The Lost Souls")
American Horror Stories (2021) (episode "Drive In")
 Yellowjackets (2022) (episode "Sic Transit Gloria Mundi")
Charmed (2022) (episode "Truth or Dares")
CSI: Vegas (2023) (episode "Third Time's the Charm")

References

External links

1968 births
People from Havana
American people of Cuban descent
Cuban film directors
Horror film directors
Independent Spirit Award winners
Living people
Montgomery College alumni
University of Central Florida alumni
Cuban expatriates in Spain
American television writers
Cuban television writers